A Girl Against Napoleon or The Devil Made a Woman, also known under its Spanish title Carmen, la de Ronda, is a 1959 Spanish historical adventure film directed by Tulio Demicheli and starring Sara Montiel, Jorge Mistral and Maurice Ronet. It is loosely based on the story of Prosper Mérimée's Carmen, with the setting changed to the Peninsular War era. Carmen is involved with the guerrillas fighting against the French occupation.

The film's sets were designed by the art director Enrique Alarcón and built at CEA Studios in Madrid.

Plot
The year is 1808. A year passed since the beginning of the Peninsular War and singer Carmen is in love with two men at the same time. The men are: a guerrilla named Antonio and the French sergeant José, who, during the war, end up on the opposite sides and therefore are sworn enemies to each other.

Cast

Sara Montiel as Carmen  
Jorge Mistral as Antonio  
Maurice Ronet as José  
Germán Cobos as Lucas  
José Marco Davó as Alcalde  
Félix Fernández as El Dancairo  
María de los Ángeles Hortelano as Micaela  
Santiago Rivero as Andrés  
Alfonso Rojas 
Agustín González as Guerrillero  
Antonio Delgado 
Pilar Gómez Ferrer 
Manuel Guitián as Pregonero  
Teresa Gisbert 
Joaquín Bergía 
Víctor Bayo 
Ricardo Tundidor
Antonio Cintado as Oficial francés  
Amedeo Nazzari as Coronel 
Ventura Oller

References

External links

Spanish historical adventure films
Films based on Carmen
Films directed by Tulio Demicheli
Films set in Spain
Films set in 1808
Napoleonic Wars films
Guerrilla warfare in film
1950s Spanish films